Middleton is a city in Hardeman County, Tennessee, United States. The population was 706 at the 2010 census, up from 602 at the 2000 census. It is located at the intersection of Tennessee State Route 125 and Tennessee State Route 57. Its slogan is the "Crossroads of the South".

History
The town was originally called "Jenkins-McCommons Crossing", after Jesse Jenksins and William Taylor McCommons. These two men came to the area from North Carolina in 1849 and donated the majority of land where Middleton is today. Following the expansion of the Memphis and Charleston Railroad and the construction of a railroad depot, Middleton was chartered in 1850. It was named after an official at the Memphis and Charleston Railroad. The town suffered greatly during the Civil War. After the war, only one building, a small log structure that served as a store, was left standing.

Geography
Middleton is located in southeastern Hardeman County at  (35.058798, -88.891728). Tennessee State Route 125 is the city's Main Street, leading north  to Bolivar, the county seat, and south  to the Mississippi border. Tennessee State Route 57 (Tennessee Avenue) crosses Route 125 in the southern part of Middleton, leading east  to Ramer and west  to Grand Junction.

The city drains east to Cypress Creek, a north-flowing tributary of the Hatchie River.

Demographics

As of the census of 2000, there were 602 people, 259 households, and 171 families residing in the city. The population density was 326.3 people per square mile (126.3/km2). There were 289 housing units at an average density of 156.7 per square mile (60.6/km2). The racial makeup of the city was 87.87% White, 11.30% African American, 0.66% Asian, and 0.17% from two or more races. Hispanic or Latino of any race were 0.66% of the population.

There were 259 households, out of which 31.3% had children under the age of 18 living with them, 50.2% were married couples living together, 13.9% had a female householder with no husband present, and 33.6% were non-families. 31.3% of all households were made up of individuals, and 14.7% had someone living alone who was 65 years of age or older. The average household size was 2.27 and the average family size was 2.84.

In the city, the population was spread out, with 23.4% under the age of 18, 8.6% from 18 to 24, 23.6% from 25 to 44, 24.4% from 45 to 64, and 19.9% who were 65 years of age or older. The median age was 41 years. For every 100 females, there were 77.1 males. For every 100 females age 18 and over, there were 79.4 males.

The median income for a household in the city was $30,385, and the median income for a family was $39,063. Males had a median income of $31,094 versus $21,250 for females. The per capita income for the city was $15,616. About 8.3% of families and 14.3% of the population were below the poverty line, including 22.4% of those under age 18 and 22.4% of those age 65 or over.

Economy
Middleton is home to a  rail-served commercial park. The town also has a major natural gas distribution facility and other industrial manufacturers that employee over 1,000. ThyssenKrupp (formerly Dover Corporation) has an elevator manufacturing plant in Middleton. Other industries include Middleton Fiberglass, F.L. Crane Inc. Spray Coating Division, a hardwood sales company, EP Minerals, LLC, makes of cat litter, and El Paso Tennessee Gas.

Arts and culture

Annual cultural events
Middleton hosts a series of annual events including the Fur, Fin and Feather Festival over Labor Day, the "M-Town Variety Show" in March, and an annual Christmas parade and related holiday events each December.

Points of interest
The oldest structure in Middleton is the Rose House which was built by Benjamin Rose in 1833. The second oldest building is the Methodist Church and Adams Masonic Lodge #264 which was built in 1859. The City Hall is also the location of the local veterans memorial. The community has a library, a community center, two city parks and a "Boy Scout Hut" which serves as a meeting space for the local Boy Scouts of America troop, which was founded in Middleton in 1938.

Government
Middleton is governed by a mayor and five aldermen, one of whom serves as vice mayor. They are elected every four years. The town's property taxes are .99 per $100 of assessed value.

Infrastructure

Transportation
Major thoroughfares
 Tennessee State Route 57 (Tennessee Avenue)
 Tennessee State Route 125 (Main Street)

Railroad systems
 Norfolk Southern Railway

Utilities

Middleton provides residents water and sewer utilities. The community also has a recycling drop off.

Safety
The town has a full-time police chief and department. The community is also served by the Middleton Volunteer Fire Department. The current firehouse was built at no charge by inmates from the Hardeman County Correctional Facility. The fire department has a Class 5 fire insurance rating.

Health
Middleton has two medical clinics, a dental clinic and a nursing home.

Notable natives
Middleton has been the birthplace, home, or vacation town for a number of notable people. Bailey Howell, NBA Hall of Famer was born and raised in Middleton until attending Mississippi State University. Howell was a Boston Celtics player, along with Steve Hamer, who was born in Memphis went to high school in Middleton before he attended the University of Tennessee. Another athlete, Wayne Haddix, was born in nearby Bolivar but attended Middleton High School, he would go on to play for the Tampa Bay Buccaneers.

Jim Stewart and Estelle Axton, the co-founders of Stax Records, were born in Middleton, before moving to Memphis.

References

External links
City of Middleton official website

Cities in Tennessee
Cities in Hardeman County, Tennessee